"Twisted (Everyday Hurts)" is a song by Skunk Anansie, released as their second single from their second album, Stoosh. It was released in November 1996 and reached number 26 on the UK Singles Chart.

Music video
The music video was directed by Anton Beebe. It begins the band walking through a desert while chained and ends with Skin pressing the button, only to reveal that the "desert" was in fact a dream with the band still asleep in a black room. It was inspired by the film Total Recall.

Track listing

CD single – CD1

CD single – CD2

Charts

References

1996 singles
Skunk Anansie songs
1996 songs
Songs written by Skin (musician)
Song recordings produced by Garth Richardson
One Little Indian Records singles